Besthorpe is a village and civil parish in the Breckland district of Norfolk, England, about a mile east of Attleborough, on the A11 road.  According to the 2001 census it had a population of 561, increasing to 778 at the 2011 Census.

The villages name origin is uncertain but is thought to mean 'Bosi's outlying farms/settlement' or perhaps, 'bent-grass outlying farm/settlement'.

The village school has long been closed and is now a private dwelling. The church is located in a remote part of the parish, giving rise to the belief that plague, the Black Death, once decimated the original community, resulting in the destruction of many local dwellings. Although no factual evidence exists to support this theory, the plague hit Norfolk very badly.

There are two notable private residences, known as Old Hall and New Hall. Old Hall is located close to Burgh Common and was also known as Plassing Hall. For many years it was a farm but has recently been converted into a private dwelling. It still possesses a section of moat and some original stained glass. New Hall was built between 1560 and 1593 by the family of Robert Drury (c.1456-1535), who gave his name to Drury Lane in London. One of the daughters from this family was rumoured to have been drowned in the lake at Lord Byron's family home, Newstead Abbey. Reference books on ghost stories claim that she was murdered along with a coachman with whom she formed a relationship; a 'phantom coach' is said to haunt the Abbey. The Hall possesses one of the few surviving 'tilting grounds' in England; tilting grounds were used for jousting by medieval knights.

A local road has achieved wider notoriety, because of the connotations of its first syllable: Slutshole Lane (sometimes Sluts Hole Lane). However, according to maps and documents held at Norfolk & Norwich Library, the road has also been known as Slutch Hole Lane. The word "slutch" was an archaic term for mud; it is said to be a cognate of "slush" , although a rival etymology connects it to "sluice" (which originated as the Dutch sluis), in the sense of an engineering device created to drain fens. It has also been suggested that the current name was the result of an error by census takers, during the late Victorian era.  Attempts to change the spelling, including a residents' petition in 1999, have been opposed by local historians.

War Memorial
Besthorpe's War Memorial is located in All Saints' Churchyard. It is a Celtic Cross which bears the following names for the First World War: 
 Corporal William C. Butcher (1892-1916), 9th Battalion, Royal Norfolk Regiment
 Lance-Corporal Frederick G. Woodgate (1893-1916), 1st Battalion, Royal Norfolk Regiment
 Gunner Gordon R. Downes (1896-1918), 27th Brigade, Royal Field Artillery
 Private Albert Eastoll (1877-1916), 1st Battalion, Cambridgeshire Regiment
 Private George H. Long (1895-1917), 11th Battalion, Cheshire Regiment
 Private Arthur W. Eagling (1899-1919), East Surrey Regiment
 Private Edward Brown (d.1916), 4th Battalion, East Yorkshire Regiment
 Private Edward J. Eagling (1885-1914), 1st Battalion, Lincolnshire Regiment
 Private Frederick G. Eastoll (1890-1916), 1st Battalion, Royal Norfolk Regiment
 Private Harry A. Houchen (1886-1917), 1st Battalion, Royal Norfolk Regiment
 Private Arthur G. Long (1893-1917), 2nd Battalion, Queen's Royal Regiment (West Surrey)
 Private Edward C. Sider (1895-1916), 8th Battalion, Queen's Royal Regiment (West Surrey)
 Private Charles J. Clark (1892-1915), Suffolk Yeomanry
 Private Herbert Standley (1887-1918), Depot, Welch Regiment
 Private Wallace H. Eastell (1898-1918), 13th Battalion, York and Lancaster Regiment
 Sapper Alfred C. Chatteris (1880-1917), Royal Engineers

References

http://kepn.nottingham.ac.uk/map/place/Norfolk/Besthorpe

External links

 Besthorpe New Hall history

Villages in Norfolk
Civil parishes in Norfolk
Breckland District